Logan is a census-designated place and unincorporated community in Ward County, North Dakota, United States. Its population was 247 as of the 2020 census.

Demographics

2020 census
At the census of 2020, there were 247 people in 105 households. There were 95 housing units.

References

Census-designated places in Ward County, North Dakota
Census-designated places in North Dakota
Unincorporated communities in North Dakota
Unincorporated communities in Ward County, North Dakota